The Jacuí River is a river in Rio Grande do Sul state of southern Brazil. The Jacuí empties into the Guaíba River, an estuarine arm of the Lagoa dos Patos, a large coastal lagoon connected to the Atlantic Ocean.

Sources

The Jacuí River, known as 'Rio Jacuí' in Portuguese, has its origins in the highlands east of Passo Fundo. The Taquari, Caí, Sinos, and Gravataí rivers merge into the Jacuí near its mouth. At Porto Alegre, near the Atlantic coast, the Jacuí transforms into a shallow estuary, known as the Guaíba River, and flows into the Patos Lagoon. Boats can travel up the river as far as Cachoeira do Sul.

Regional effects

The Dona Francisca Hydroelectric Dam impounds the upper Jacuí River, and is divided between the municipalities of Agudo and Nova Palma, Rio Grande do Sul.
The park was created in 2005 as environmental compensation for the hydroelectric plant.

The estuary contains the Banhados do Delta Biological Reserve, which protects the islands of Pólvora and Pombas.

References

Rivers of Rio Grande do Sul